A Fair Impostor is a 1916 British silent drama film directed by Alexander Butler and starring Madge Titheradge, Gerald McCarthy and Charles Rock. It was made at Isleworth Studios. It was based on a 1909 novel of the same title by Charles Garvice.

Outline
The daughter of a lord discovers that a maid is her missing sister. She poses as the maid, to gain her inheritance.

Cast
 Madge Titheradge as Lady Irene 
 Gerald McCarthy as Terence Castleford 
 Charles Rock as Lord Mercia 
 Alice De Winton as Elsa Graham 
 Edward O'Neill as Mayne Redmayne  
 Harry Lofting as Vicar  
 Lionel d'Aragon
 Florence Nelson

References

Bibliography
 Harris, Ed. Britain's Forgotten Film Factory: The Story of Isleworth Studios. Amberley Publishing, 2013.

External links

1916 films
1916 drama films
British silent feature films
British drama films
Films directed by Alexander Butler
Films set in England
Films shot at Isleworth Studios
Films based on British novels
British black-and-white films
1910s English-language films
1910s British films
Silent drama films